Prague 7 is a municipal district (městská část) in Prague, Czech Republic.

The administrative district (správní obvod) of the same name consists of the quarters Letná, Holešovice, Bubny, Bubeneč, Troja as well as a small part of Libeň. It's one of the smallest Prague districts and stretches along the left bank of the Vltava. In the Northern part is located Troja with the Prague Zoo. It is linked to the city centre by metro line C. Other attractions in Prague 7 include the stadium of the Czech football club AC Sparta, cultural centre DOX Center for Contemporary Art, cinema Bio Oko, museums (National Technical Museum and National Museum of Agriculture) and the former trade fair centre Veletržní palác. Its parks Stromovka and Letná rank among the biggest in the capital.

See also
Districts of Prague#Symbols

References

External links 
 More information about Prague 7 and life there may be found in the correspondent article on the Prague Website Citypilot.cz

 
Districts of Prague